Percy Ford (5 July 1877 – 2 December 1920) was an English cricketer. He played for Gloucestershire between 1906 and 1908.

References

1877 births
1920 deaths
English cricketers
Gloucestershire cricketers
People from Whitminster
Sportspeople from Gloucestershire